Ralph Louis Ketcham (October 29, 1927 – April 26, 2017) was an American academic. For almost 60 years, he served as a professor of history and political science at Syracuse University. Ketcham's academic focus was on political theory and the American founding with an emphasis on James Madison.

Early life and education 
Born on October 28, 1927 in Berea, Ohio, Ketcham was raised in New Hartford, New York. His parents were Sherman and Laura Murphy Ketcham.  In 1959, he married Julia Stillwell.  The couple had two children: Benjamin and Laura Lee.

Ketcham attended the United States Coast Guard Academy, Allegheny College, and Colgate University and earned his PhD in American Studies at Syracuse University in 1956.

Career
After obtaining his PhD, Ketcham taught briefly at the University of Chicago and at Yale. In 1963, he joined Syracuse's Maxwell School of Citizenship and Public Affairs, which specializes in the social sciences, public policy, public administration, and international relations.

Though he retired in 1997, Ketcham continued to write and to teach an annual graduate symposium on the foundations of American thought.

Bibliography 
He was the author of a dozen books, including:
 Ketcham, Ralph. From Colony to Country: The Revolution in American Thought, 1750-1820. New York: Macmillan, 1974.
 Ketcham, Ralph, and Sean Runnette. The Anti-Federalist Papers and the Constitutional Convention Debates. Old Saybrook, Conn: Tantor Media, 2019 
 translated into Spanish   as Escritos antifederalistas y debates de la convención constitucional de EE.UU. Barcelona: Hacer, 1996.
 Presidents Above Party: The First American Presidency, 1789-1829 (1984) 
 Ketcham, Ralph Louis. Individualism and Public Life: A Modern Dilemma. Oxford: Blackwell, 1987 
 Framed for Posterity: The Enduring Philosophy of the Constitution (1993)
 The Idea of Democracy in the Modern Era (2004)
 Ketcham, R. (2011). Madisons at Montpelier: Reflections on the founding couple University of Virginia Press, 2011. 
 Public-Spirited Citizenship: Leadership and Good Government in the United States  
 Ketcham, Ralph. Benjamin Franklin. New York: Washington Square Press, 1966.
 Ketcham, Ralph Louis. The Idea of Democracy in the Modern Era. Lawrence, Kan: University Press of Kansas, 2004.
 James Madison: A Biography (1971) 

Ketcham also edited books of selected writings by Benjamin Franklin and James Madison.

Honors 
 1979 – Inaugural recipient of the Chancellor's Citation for Outstanding Academic Achievement
 1987 – Selected as national professor of the year by the Council for the Advancement and Support of Education
 1999 – Honorary degree from Syracuse University
 2003 – George Arents Medal for career achievement

References

External links

 

1927 births
2017 deaths
American writers
Syracuse University alumni
University of Chicago faculty
Yale University faculty
People from Berea, Ohio
Colgate University people